Brutus is a pioneering funny car driven by Jim Liberman and prepared by crew chief Lew Arrington in the middle 1960s.

Liberman and Arrington made a deal with Pontiac to supply Drarare hemis (remnants of Mickey Thompson's gas dragster program). Brutus was sponsored by Larry Hopkins Pontiac in Sunnyvale, California, and Goodies Speed Shop, and ran a 6-71 Jimmy blower, Venolia pistons, Crane cam, and Mondello conrods.

Notes

Sources
Wallace, Dave.  “50 Years of Funny Cars” in Drag Racer, November 2016, pp.20-21.

Drag racing cars
1960s cars
Rear-wheel-drive vehicles